Fred Marsh (1 May 1910 – 12 September 1974) was a British weightlifter. He competed in the men's featherweight event at the 1936 Summer Olympics.

References

External links
 

1910 births
1974 deaths
British male weightlifters
Olympic weightlifters of Great Britain
Weightlifters at the 1936 Summer Olympics
Sportspeople from Leeds